The Orlons are an American R&B group from Philadelphia, Pennsylvania that formed in 1960. The group won gold discs for three of their singles.

Career
The quartet consisted of lead singer Rosetta Hightower (June 23, 1944 – August 2, 2014), Shirley Brickley (December 9, 1944 – October 13, 1977), Marlena Davis (October 4, 1944 – February 27, 1993), and Stephen Caldwell (born November 22, 1942).

Before they became the Orlons, they were an all-girl quintet called Audrey and the Teenettes. They formed in the late 1950s in junior high school and consisted of Hightower, Davis, and three Brickley sisters: Shirley, Jean, and Audrey. However, after the Brickleys' mother did not permit 13-year-old Audrey to sing in certain nightclubs with the group, she and Jean quit, making the group a trio.

In high school, the group's three remaining members discovered fellow student Stephen Caldwell, who was lead singer of a local group called the Romeos. Impressed, they invited him to join the group in 1960 and named themselves the Orlons as a tongue-in-cheek nod to the friendly rivalry they had with a popular group at their high school, the Cashmeres. (Orlon was a brand name for the widely used synthetic fiber acrylic.)

A high school friend, Dovells lead singer Len Barry, encouraged them to audition for Cameo-Parkway Records at the turn of the decade. The group took his advice in the fall of 1961, but were rejected at first, although the record label signed the group after two more auditions. Cameo executive Dave Appell appointed Hightower as the lead singer, and began writing songs for them.

In 1962, the group provided back-up vocals for Dee Dee Sharp's hits "Mashed Potato Time" and "Gravy (For My Mashed Potatoes)". They later found fame with their first national hit, "The Wah-Watusi", which reached No. 2 in the US pop chart and which triggered the brief Watusi dance craze. They recorded their own versions of the Dee Dee Sharp songs for their debut album, The Wah-Watusi, which received a rating of 4.5 out of 5 from AllMusic in 2006. They had a second hit in the same year with "Don't Hang Up", a No. 4 hit on the pop chart. The group had three  hits in 1963: "South Street", the group's last Top Ten hit, which reached No. 3 on the Billboard chart; "Not Me", which reached No. 12; and "Crossfire", the group's last hit, which reached No. 19.

They also recorded a version of the Bobby Rydell hit "The Cha-Cha-Cha", which includes the line "When you see the Wah-Watusi, you go a-ha-ha-ha," poking fun at their own hit.

Davis left the group in August 1963 and Caldwell quit the group in 1964, Sandy Person replaced Davis. A short-lived stint by Yvonne Young was followed by original Teenette, Audrey Brickley, Shirley's sister. By then, the group's popularity had waned in the United States.  They continued to perform into the late 1960s with success in the UK. They disbanded in 1968 after Hightower decided to stay in England after a tour. Hightower had a successful career as a soloist and as an in-demand session singer, backing Joe Cocker, John Holt and other artists. She married record producer Ian Green.

In later years, Davis married and found work as an executive secretary, whilst Caldwell became a shop steward of the bus drivers' trade union, and then became the administrator of the union's legal fund in Philadelphia and served on the Philadelphia Board of Education for 29 years. In 1988, Caldwell and Davis re-formed the group with two new members and performed live on the oldies circuit until Davis' death in 1993.

On October 13, 1977, Shirley Brickley was shot dead by an intruder in her home in Philadelphia. Marlena Davis died of lung cancer on February 27, 1993 (aged 48).  Audrey Brickley died of acute respiratory distress syndrome on July 3, 2005 (aged 58).  Rosetta Hightower Green died in Clapham, London, on August 2, 2014, at the age of 70.  Caldwell and Jean Brickley still perform as the Orlons with two of Caldwell's cousins, Alberta Crump and Madeline Morris.

In March 2012, Caldwell and Brickley took part in the benefit single "Mull of Kintyre", featuring Charlie Gracie with Clutch Cargo.

Awards
"The Wah-Watusi," "Don't Hang Up," and "South Street" each sold over one million copies and were awarded gold disc status.

Discography

Albums
(Chart positions and featured charted hits in parentheses)
1962: The Wah-Watusi—Cameo C-1020 (U.S. Billboard No. 80) 
1963: All the Hits by The Orlons—Cameo C-1033 
1963: South Street—Cameo C-1041 (U.S. Billboard No. 123) 
1963: Not Me—Cameo C-1054 
1963: Down Memory Lane—Cameo C-1073

Compilation albums
1963: Biggest Hits—Cameo C-1061
1963: Golden Hits—Cameo C-1067 (Duet compilation with the Dovells)
2005: The Best of The Orlons (Abkco compilation under series title: "Cameo Parkway 1961–1966")

Singles

 *Compilations of various Cameo/Parkway artists

References

Bibliography
Clemente, John ed. (2013). Girl Groups — Fabulous Females Who Rocked The World (Second ed.). Authorhouse Publishing. pp. 384–387.

External links

The Best of The Orlons CD release on Abkco's Cameo-Parkway compilation page
The Orlons at history-of-rock.com
The Orlons at Doo Wop Heaven

African-American musical groups
American soul musical groups
Musical groups from Philadelphia
Cameo Records artists
Doo-wop groups
Musical groups established in 1960
1960 establishments in Pennsylvania